Teatro Prezewodowski is one of oldest theaters in South America. It was built in 1883 at the town of Itaqui, Brazil.

Theatres in Rio Grande do Sul
Theatres completed in 1883